Sylvania Wilderness is an  protected area located a few miles west of Watersmeet Township, Michigan.  Sylvania is located entirely within the bounds of the Ottawa National Forest, and is currently being managed as a wilderness area as part of the National Wilderness Preservation System by the U.S. Forest Service.

Within its borders lie 34 lakes set against a backdrop of old-growth forests.  It represents one of only a handful of such areas left in the Midwest.

History 

Little is known of the area prior to the late 1800s, other than the area was frequently used by clans of Ojibwa Native Americans, as evidenced by the few scattered artifacts that have been found there.  In 1895, a Wisconsin lumberman by the name of A.D. Johnston purchased  of land at the south end of Clark Lake with the intent to cut the large pines located there.  Upon seeing the land for himself, he was so taken by the rugged beauty of it that he changed his mind and decided to preserve it.  He soon invited friends, many of whom were equally impressed and so moved to purchase adjacent lands, and after some time the Sylvania Club was formed, with fishing, hunting, and hiking being the main focus.  The owners built lodges and cabins on the larger lakes, and the area became an exclusive resort for a small number of affluent and influential guests.  Ownership changed hands over the years, and finally the entire area was purchased by the United States Forest Service in 1967, which promptly removed all buildings and began managing it as a special recreation area.  In 1987, it was designated as a federal wilderness when the Michigan Wilderness Act was passed by Congress and signed into law by Ronald Reagan.

Sylvania facts 
Sylvania straddles the divide between the Lake Superior and the Mississippi River drainage systems, occupying some of the highest ground in the Midwest. Due to this apex position, these deep, clear lakes are primarily landlocked, fed by springs and local run-off. There are no surface streams entering the park, which is one of the reasons the lakes remain pristine and pure. For this same reason, the lakes are a bit "fragile" (low flush rates, low nutrient loads, etc.). Special fishing regulations on these lakes, including catch and release for all bass, have helped to preserve the lakes' fisheries. The Sylvania Wilderness also features  of hiking trails and portages within its .

Sugar maple, eastern hemlock, and yellow birch are the most common trees, and are found along with white, red, and jack pine, white spruce, balsam fir, and paper birch.

Wildlife abounds in the park, with white-tailed deer, black bear, grey wolves, porcupines, bobcat, beaver, otter, coyote, fox, bald eagle, loon, osprey, and many others.

Soils are mostly classic podzol sandy loam or loamy sand developed on glacial till or outwash. Among the most common series are Gogebic, Karlin and Keeweenaw.

There are 84 designated campsites in 29 locations throughout the wilderness, each with rudimentary amenities such as outdoor toilets, tent pads, pack racks (for keeping foodstuffs out of reach of wildlife), and fire-grills.

List of major lakes in Sylvania
Big Bateau Lake
Clark Lake
Clear Lake
Crooked Lake
Deer Island Lake
Devils Head Lake
Dream Lake
East Bear Lake
Fisher Lake
Florence Lake
Glimmerglass Lake
Helen Lake
High Lake
Indian Lake
Katherine Lake
Little Duck Lake
Long Lake
Loon Lake
Marsh Lake
Moss Lake
Mountain Lake
Snap Jack Lake
West Bear Lake
Whitefish Lake

References

External links
Sylvania Wilderness and Recreation Area, Ottawa National Forest U.S. Forest Service
Map of Sylvania Wilderness, Ottawa National Forest U.S. Forest Service

Protected areas of Gogebic County, Michigan
Wilderness areas of Michigan
Ottawa National Forest
Old-growth forests